Because Why is a 1993 Canadian independent film, directed by Arto Paragamian and starring Michael Riley. Very low-keyed, with doses of comedy, the film won the Audience Award at the 1994 Mannheim International Film Festival.

Plot
After several years of travelling abroad Alex returns to his hometown. All he has is a backpack, a skateboard and a slip of paper with an ex-girlfriend's address. When this address turns out to be an empty lot, Alex feels lost. He then moves into a neighbourhood which features an odd array of characters.

References

External links

1993 films
Canadian comedy films
English-language Canadian films
Films directed by Arto Paragamian
1990s English-language films
1990s Canadian films